Blowin may refer to:

 "Blowin'" (song), a 1992 song by B'z
 [[Blowin' (album)|Blowin''' (album)]], a 1976 album by The Noel Redding Band

See also
 Blowing'', a 1996 album by Tokio